The Bit–Khang languages consist of:
Bit cluster: Bit (a.k.a. Khabit, Psing, Buxing) and Quang Lam
Khang cluster: Kháng and Bumang

The Bit–Khang languages are spoken in southern China, northern Laos, and northwestern Vietnam. The Bit-Khang branch was first proposed by Paul Sidwell (2014).

Classification
At first, Bit–Khang languages were usually classified as Khmuic, but Sidwell (2014) has since demonstrated the Palaungic affiliation of Bit-Khang, as well as its unity. Paul Sidwell (2014) proposes that these languages constitute a subgroup of Palaungic, since they display lexical innovations characteristic of the Palaungic branch such as 'eye', 'fire', 'blood', and 'laugh'.

Sidwell (2014) suggests that Bit–Khang may have originally been Eastern Palaungic, due to various isoglosses shared with Waic, Lametic, and Angkuic, but was later heavily relexified by Khmuic as Bit-Khang speakers migrated eastward into Khmuic territory.

References

Languages of Vietnam
Languages of China
Languages of Laos
Palaungic languages